, officially abbreviated as , is a 2018 Japanese animated high fantasy drama film written and directed by Mari Okada and produced by P.A. Works.<ref name=ann>{{cite web|title=anohana'''s Mari Okada debuts as director with Sayonara no Asa ni Yakusoku no Hana o Kazarō anime film|url=https://www.animenewsnetwork.com/news/2017-07-05/anohana-mari-okada-debuts-as-director-with-sayonara-no-asa-ni-yakusoku-no-hana-o-kazarou-anime-film/.118448|work=Anime News Network|access-date=July 6, 2017|date=July 6, 2017|first=Jennifer|last=Sherman}}</ref> It features animation direction and character designs by Yuriko Ishii adapted from Akihiko Yoshida's original designs, and music composed by Kenji Kawai.Maquia: When the Promised Flower Blooms tells the story of the titular Maquia, a young girl who is a member of a special race called the Iorph, mystical beings who can live for hundreds of years. While escaping war, she finds a lone surviving infant and decides to raise him as her son.

The film is Okada's directorial debut and the first standalone feature-length, theatrically-released production of P.A. Works. It premiered in Japan by Showgate on February 24, 2018, and at the Glasgow Film Festival on March 4, 2018. It was released by Madman Entertainment on June 7, 2018. It was released by Anime Limited on June 27, 2018. It was released by Eleven Arts on July 20, 2018. The film's English dub premiered on September 21, 2018, in the United States. It was released on DVD and Blu-ray Disc in Northern America on February 5, 2019. The DVD  has only an English track, while the BD has both English and Japanese tracks.

Plot
The Iorph, a humanoid race, live far removed from the world of humans, spending their days weaving Hibiol, a special cloth which serves as a written chronicle of the passing of time. They age much slower than humans, and can live for hundreds of years. They are legendary to outsiders, who have dubbed them the "Clan of the Separated".

Maquia, a young, orphaned Iorph girl, serves as an assistant to the clan's chief, Racine, who warns her about creating emotional attachments to outsiders, saying that Maquia will know what true loneliness is if she does. Soon afterward, the neighboring kingdom of Mezarte sends armed soldiers on the backs of flying dragons called Renato to the Iorph village. Unable to find the secret to their longevity, the army attacks, killing most of the Iorph and kidnapping Leilia, Maquia's friend. One of the Renato succumbs to the "Red Eye" disease and goes berserk during the attack. It becomes tangled in Hibiol, and flees the village, inadvertently carrying Maquia, who is tangled in the fabric. The Renato later crashes and dies in a forest. Maquia wakes up and meets an alcoholic merchant at the ambushed caravan, where she finds a newborn baby boy, held tightly in the arms of his deceased mother. Refusing to let him die, she pulls the baby from the woman's arms and takes him in as her son. She travels to the village of Helm, where a woman, Mido, takes them in, raising them alongside her two sons, Lang and Deol. Maquia names her adopted son Ariel.

Time passes and Ariel has grown into a child. The Kingdom of Mezarte had once built their strength and reputation on their ownership of the ancient Renato, but the Renato have started to succumb to the "Red Eye" disease, leaving them with less than ten as they begin to die out. Fearing the inevitable loss of power and influence, the king of Mezarte tries to claim ownership of another ancient and legendary power, the Iorph's longevity, leading him to attempt to introduce Iorph blood into the royal bloodline. Through a message woven into a Hibiol Maquia finds in a shop, she discovers that Leilia has been forced into an arranged marriage with the prince of Mezarte. She travels on a ship with Ariel to try to free Leilia. On the ship, she meets Krim, an Iorph. He is a friend of hers from their homeland, who was Leilia's former boyfriend and Maquia's secret crush. Krim is also seeking to free Leilia. Once in the capital of Mezarte, the two meet with a number of other Iorph, and unsuccessfully ambush a royal parade. Maquia briefly frees Leilia, but learns that Leilia is pregnant with the prince's child. Maquia flees on Leilia's orders and avoids capture with the help of the merchant, revealed to be half-Iorph. Krim, undeterred, resolves to continue trying to free Leilia, and leaves Maquia and Ariel behind.

As more time passes, Maquia and Ariel move to the iron-forge city of Dorail, where Maquia works as a restaurant waitress. Ariel grows to be a teenage forge worker. He becomes alienated from Maquia by the ever-decreasing difference in their apparent ages. Meanwhile, Leilia, still in the palace, is a prisoner of the royals. She has been cast aside because her daughter Medmel shows no signs of being an Iorph. She has not been able to meet Medmel ever since her birth, leaving her in despair. One day, Ariel and Maquia happen to meet Lang, now a soldier in Mezarte's army. Their meeting pushes Ariel and Maquia farther apart, allowing Ariel to join the army of Mezarte. Moments after he leaves, Maquia is kidnapped by Krim.

Approximately ten years later, Ariel has returned to the capital and married Dita, a girl he knew in Helm. She is pregnant with their first child. Meanwhile, Krim has gathered the support of the surrounding nations to invade and overthrow Mezarte. He takes a still-captive Maquia with him, trying to reach the palace in the battle. They are separated in a forest outside the capital, and after a brief encounter with Ariel, Maquia goes to the town and finds Dita in labor. She helps deliver the baby, while Ariel continues to fight and is wounded in the battle. Maquia finds Ariel and they share a heartfelt conversation before she offers him an emotional goodbye, and then she heads to the palace. Elsewhere, after finally finding Leilia in the palace and being rejected in favor of Medmel, Krim tries to kill both her and himself, but Krim is ambushed and killed by the chief of the guards. As the battle ends with Mezarte's loss, Ariel returns home and meets his newborn daughter. Maquia takes the last living Renato and flies away with Leilia, who manages to reunite briefly with Medmel before departing.

Many years later, Maquia returns to the village of Helm once again with the half-Iorph merchant, finding Ariel as an old man on his deathbed, and holds his hand as he dies. Leaving their home, she shoulders the pain of her loss, crying as she remembers the moments of her life she spent with him. Maquia rejoins the merchant and continues on the road, remarking to herself, despite the profound pain of loss, that loving her son brought her happiness.

A post-credit image shows the Iorph village being reinhabited once again by the surviving Iorph and their descendants, along with the last Renato.

Voice cast

 Music 
The film's score was composed and arranged by Kenji Kawai. The film's ending song, "Viator (ウィアートル)", was composed, arranged and performed by Rionos, with lyrics provided by Riya. 
The soundtrack was released by Bandai Visual on February 24, 2018.

Reception
Box office
The film grossed $160,988 in North America in November 2018. It grossed $4.3 million worldwide, including $1.2 million in Japan and $2.5 million in China in March 2019.

Critical response
Makoto Shinkai called Maquia: When the Promised Flower Blooms a "fantastic film that can shake up memories within you that you normally forget."

It said, "Maquia: When the Promised Flower Blooms'' anchors its colorfully imaginative fantasy setting in universal — and deeply poignant — real-world themes." Metacritic reports a weighted average score of 72 out of 100 based on eight critics, indicating "generally favorable reviews".

Miranda Sanchez, for IGN, gave the film a 8.5 out of 10 and wrote that it was "a beautiful story about motherhood, aging, and loss".

Accolades

References

External links
  
 
 
 
 
 
 
 

2018 fantasy films
2018 anime films
2018 directorial debut films
2018 drama films
Anime with original screenplays
Animated war films
Animated films about dragons
Animated films about orphans
Fantasy war films
Films scored by Kenji Kawai
Films with screenplays by Mari Okada
High fantasy films
Japanese animated fantasy films
Japanese war drama films
2010s Japanese-language films
P.A.Works
War in anime and manga